The 2016–17 Belarusian Premier League season is the 25th season of the top tier basketball league in Belarus.

Regular season

Playoffs

Source:

5th position bracket

9th position playoff

References

External links 

Belarusian Premier League (basketball) seasons
Belarus
Premier League